La Comédie-Italienne is a theatre  in the Montparnasse district of Paris, presenting Italian commedia dell'arte plays in French translation.

The present-day Comédie-Italienne is situated at 19 , where it was established in 1980 by the director Attilio Maggiulli, after the closing of his Teatrino Italiano, founded in 1975 on the avenue du Maine. The Comédie-Italienne remains the only Italian theatre in France and performs exclusively plays by Italian writers, classic and contemporary, in French translation.

Notes

Sources
 Forman, Edward (2010). Historical Dictionary of French Theater. Lanham: The Scarecrow Press. .

External links
 

Buildings and structures in the 14th arrondissement of Paris
Theatres in Paris
1975 establishments in France